Tequendama may refer to:
 Tequendama, archaeological site in Cundinamarca, one of the oldest in Colombia
 Tequendama Falls, a waterfall close to this site
 Tequendama Falls Museum, the museum at the waterfall
 Tequendama mine, emerald mine in the Western Emerald Belt, Boyacá
 Tequendama Province, a province of the department of Cundinamarca
 San Antonio del Tequendama, a municipality in the Tequendama Province
 Hotel Tequendama, a hotel in the Colombian capital Bogotá